The 2007 AFC Champions League Final was a two-legged association football tie to determine the 2007 champions of Asian club football. Urawa Red Diamonds defeated Sepahan 3-1 on aggregate to take the title. The first leg took place on 7 November 2007 at 16:00 local time (UTC+3:30) at Foolad Shahr Stadium in Fooladshahr, Isfahan and the second leg took place on 14 November 2007 at 19:20 local time (UTC+9) at Saitama Stadium, Saitama.

This was the first final to feature clubs from Iran and Japan. This was the first AFC Champions League final involving an Iranian club, and the first in an Asian top club football competition since PAS Tehran in the 1992–93 Asian Club Championship. The winners, Urawa Red Diamonds, received US$600,000 prize money and qualified to represent Asia in the 2007 FIFA Club World Cup. Although they were defeated, Sepahan still competed in the FIFA Club World Cup by replacing the host country berth, which is reserved for the J. League champions.

Format
The rules for the final were exactly the same as for the previous knockout rounds. The tie was contested over two legs with away goals deciding the winner if the two teams were level on goals after the second leg. If the teams could still not be separated at that stage then extra time would have been played with a penalty shootout taking place if the teams were still level after that.

Route to the final

Sepahan

1Sepahan's goals always recorded first.

Urawa Red Diamonds

1Urawa Red Diamonds' goals always recorded first.

Final summary

|}

First leg

Second leg

See also
 2007 AFC Champions League
 2007 FIFA Club World Cup

External links
  Sepahan Official club website
  Urawa Red Diamonds Official Site

Final
AFC Champions League Final 2007
AFC Champions League finals
AFC
International club association football competitions hosted by Japan
AFC Champions League Final 2007